The Pikeville Cut-Through is a rock cut in Pikeville, Kentucky, United States, created by the U.S. Army Corps of Engineers, through which passes a four-lane divided highway (Corridor B, numbered as U.S. Route 23 (US 23), US 119, US 460, and KY 80), a railroad line (CSX' Big Sandy Subdivision), and the Levisa Fork of the Big Sandy River. Dr. William Hambley, who served as mayor of Pikeville for 29 years, Robert H. Holcomb, Chamber of Commerce president, and Henry Stratton, local attorney, spearheaded the project.

The project was completed in 1987 following 14 years of work at a cost of $77.6 million ($ in  dollars).

Purpose

The project was initially envisioned by Pikeville native Dr. William Hambley in 1960. He wanted to relocate the railbed because he wanted to eliminate the dust that came from the coal hauling trains that passed through the city daily. In 1963, Pikeville received a $38,000 federal grant for a railroad relocation feasibility study and was named a Model City by the recently formed Model Cities Agency, generating even more funding. By 1965, his plan had further developed to accommodate Corridor B of the Appalachian Development Highway System, assuring the construction of the Pikeville Cut-Through.

It was also decided to relocate the Levisa Fork of the Big Sandy River, which then snaked through the downtown area, to eliminate almost yearly flooding. The river bed then was to be reclaimed, significantly increasing the available space for development within the city.

Construction

The project was constructed in four phases by the U.S. Army Corps of Engineers between November 26, 1973, and October 2, 1987.

Phase I of construction began on November 26, 1973. The cost of phase I at completion was $17,250,000.

Phase II of construction began on March 4, 1980. During this phase the coal tipples and railroad tracks were removed from downtown Pikeville, a bridge was constructed across the cut, the river was rerouted, and the former riverbed was filled.  of soil was moved to create  of available land in downtown at a cost of $22,200,000.

Phase III and IV of construction began on March 15, 1983. The final stages consisted of: the construction of the downtown interchanges and flood walls, another new bridge, and the construction of Hambley Boulevard atop the former railbed – a lasting tribute to William Hambley. These two phases created an additional  of downtown property at a cost of $19,700,000.

The project was dedicated on October 2, 1987.

References

External links
Tourism information

Transportation in Pike County, Kentucky
Tourist attractions in Pike County, Kentucky
Transport infrastructure completed in 1987
Cuts (earthmoving)
U.S. Route 23
Kentucky Route 80
1987 establishments in Kentucky
Pikeville, Kentucky